The 2017 Qatar Total Open was a professional women's tennis tournament played on hard courts. It was the 15th edition of the event and part of the WTA Premier series of the 2017 WTA Tour. It took place at the International Tennis and Squash complex in Doha, Qatar between 13 and 18 February 2017.

Points and prize money

Point distribution

Prize money

*per team

Singles main-draw entrants

Seeds

 1 Rankings as of February 6, 2017.

Other entrants
The following players received wildcards into the singles main draw:
  Fatma Al-Nabhani
  Çağla Büyükakçay

The following players received entry from the qualifying draw:
  Madison Brengle
  Lauren Davis
  Jelena Janković
  Christina McHale

Withdrawals
Before the tournament
  Johanna Konta → replaced by Irina-Camelia Begu
  Svetlana Kuznetsova → replaced by Laura Siegemund
  Carla Suárez Navarro → replaced by Monica Puig

Retirements
  Timea Bacsinszky
  Yulia Putintseva

Doubles main-draw entrants

Seeds

1 Rankings as of February 6, 2017.

Other entrants
The following pairs received wildcards into the doubles main draw:
  Fatma Al-Nabhani /  Mubaraka Al-Naimi
  Chuang Chia-jung /  Jelena Janković

The following pair received entry as alternates:
  Madison Brengle /  Naomi Broady

Withdrawals
Before the tournament
  Tímea Babos
  Timea Bacsinszky

Champions

Singles

 Karolína Plíšková def.  Caroline Wozniacki, 6–3, 6–4

Doubles

  Abigail Spears /  Katarina Srebotnik def.  Olga Savchuk /  Yaroslava Shvedova, 6–3, 7–6(9–7)

External links
Official Website

Qatar Total Open
Qatar Ladies Open
2017 in Qatari sport
Qatar Total Open